Nathaniel Culverwell (alternative spellings Nathanael or Culverwel; 1619–1651) was an English author and theologian, born in Middlesex. He was baptized on 14 January 1619 at the church of St. Margaret Moses where his father was rector. He was the second of six children of Richard and Margaret (Horton) Culverwell.

A student (admitted 1633) and later a fellow of Emmanuel College, Cambridge, he was associated with members of the Cambridge Platonists group.

Works 

 Spiritual Optics, or a Glass Discovering the Weakness and Imperfection of a Christian's Knowledge in this Life, 1651
 An Elegant and Learned Discourse of the Light of Nature, 1652 – His best-known work, this was originally delivered as a series of lectures in 1645–1646, and attempted mediation between reason and faith, via natural law, in the context of the opposing religious stances of the English Civil War.
 Worth of Souls
 The Schisme
 Act of Oblivion
 Child's Return
 Panting Soul
 Mount Ebal
 White Stone

References

External links 
 Nathanael Culverwel Bartleby.com biography
 An Elegant and Learned Discourse of the Light of Nature, The Online Library of Liberty.
 The Cambridge Platonists

1619 births
1651 deaths
Cambridge Platonists
British Roman Catholics
Alumni of Emmanuel College, Cambridge
Fellows of Emmanuel College, Cambridge